Jang Hee-jin (born May 9, 1983) is a South Korean actress. She began her career as a model for the fashion magazines CeCi, Marie Claire and Cindy the Perky. Jang has appeared in several television series and films, including Myung-wol the Spy and Big.

Filmography

Television series

Film

Music video

Discography

Awards

References

External links

South Korean television actresses
South Korean film actresses
King Kong by Starship artists
1983 births
Living people
Konkuk University alumni